Northcoast Bus & Coach is a former Australian bus bodybuilder in Caloundra.

History
Northcoast Bus & Coach was formed in 1985 by former GBW employees Wayne Smith and Daryl Wells from premises in Maroochydore. The first body completed was on a former Melbourne-Brighton Bus Lines Leyland Leopard for Bellarine Bus Lines. In 1990, the business moved to Caloundra.

Among some of the larger orders were a batch of Volvo B12Rs for the Australian Defence Force, Scania L113CRLs and L94UBs for Ventura Bus Lines and L94UBs for Metro Tasmania.

It ceased manufacturing operations in 2012 having built over 600 bodies, but continues provide support for its products.

References

External links
Bus Australia gallery

Bus manufacturers of Australia
Vehicle manufacturing companies established in 1985
2014 disestablishments in Australia
Australian companies established in 1985